Below there are the squads from the participating teams of the 2014 Men's European Volleyball League.





















References

European Volleyball League men's squads
2014 in volleyball